"Yearning" is a duet by George Jones and Jeanette Hicks released on Jones' debut 1956 album, Grand Ole Opry's New Star. It was released as a single on Starday Records and peaked at number 10 on the 1957 Billboard Hot Country Songs singles chart. Although Jones had previously released a couple of duets with fellow Starday artist Sonny Burns, "Yearning" was his first duet to become a hit, making the Top 10.

Jones released another duet version of this song with Margie Singleton on their 1962 album, Duets Country Style.

Chart performance

References

1957 songs
Songs written by George Jones
George Jones songs
Song recordings produced by Pappy Daily
Starday Records singles